The 5th African Entertainment Awards USA was held at the New Jersey Institute of Technology in Newark, New Jersey on October 19, 2019 and was televised on Sahara TV. Nominees were revealed on August 23, 2019. The 5th ceremony honors African excellence as it marks 5 years as an NGO and the show host were; Eric Omondi, and Anita Fabiola.

Performers
Artist

Afro-Afriqué
 S Dubbz
 Etoo Tsana
 Ms. Bodega
 Miri Ben-Ari
 Bones
 Eddy Kenzo
 Sade Emoni
 Nyla Tamin
 Nandy
 Yobass
 Chetekela
 Morachi

Presenters
 Anita Fabiola
 Eric Omondi

Nominations and winners
The following is a list of nominees and the winners are listed highlighted in boldface.

Note
 Eddy Kenzo was announced the winner of the Best African Entertainer Of The Year, while fans criticize the fairness of the award.

Special Recognition Awards
On 18 September 2019, at the pre-show, AEAUSA honors; Sbusiso Leope, Oliver Mtukudzi, and Ms. Bodega.

References

External links 
PERFORMING LIVE `{`2019 AWARD SHOW`}`

2019 music awards
2019 awards
2019 awards in the United States